Anitra is an Arabic-sounding female given name, originally invented in the 1860s by the playwright Henrik Ibsen for a minor character in his play Peer Gynt. It later became popular as a female name in Scandinavian countries. Notable people with the name include:

Anitra Ahtola
Anitra Ford
Anitra Rasmussen
Anitra Steen
 Anitra Lippmaa

See also 
1016 Anitra, a main-belt asteroid
Anitra's Dance

Feminine given names
Peer Gynt